Christian Alfonso López (born 2 May 1989) is a Spanish professional footballer who plays for CE L'Hospitalet as an attacking midfielder.

Club career
Born in Barcelona, Catalonia, Alfonso signed with RCD Espanyol in 2002 at the age of 13, from neighbours CE L'Hospitalet. Two years later he returned to his previous club, with which he made his senior debut, appearing in two Segunda División B games in the 2007–08 season as his team eventually suffered relegation. He was an essential unit in the subsequent promotion, then scored ten goals from 30 appearances to help them retain their status.

Alfonso moved to Espanyol again in late March 2011, alongside teammate Cristian Gómez – the transfer being effective as of July – initially being assigned to the reserves. On 2 October 2011 he made his first-team (and La Liga) debut, playing 16 minutes in a 0–4 home loss against Real Madrid.

On 15 August 2013, Alfonso joined AD Alcorcón of Segunda División, in a season-long loan deal. He scored his first professional goal on 1 September, the first in a 3–0 home win over Recreativo de Huelva.

Alfonso was loaned to fellow league team Girona FC on 29 August 2014, also in a one-year deal. Roughly a year later, he terminated his contract with Espanyol.

References

External links

1989 births
Living people
Spanish footballers
Footballers from Barcelona
Association football midfielders
La Liga players
Segunda División players
Segunda División B players
Tercera División players
Tercera Federación players
CE L'Hospitalet players
RCD Espanyol B footballers
RCD Espanyol footballers
AD Alcorcón footballers
Girona FC players
Lleida Esportiu footballers